Tuomas Eerola is professor in Music Cognition at Durham University. He studied at the University of Jyväskylä from where he received his MA in Music in 1997, and his PhD in Musicology in 2003. His research focuses on music and emotion. He has over 100 publications that can be accessed from Google Scholar. He has been awarded major research grants from Academy of Finland to study the appeal of sad music, from Economic and Social Research Council to explore the tagging of emotions in music, and Arts and Humanities Research Council (as a co-PI) to study the interpersonal entrainment in music performance

References 

Music psychologists
Living people
Academics of Durham University
Year of birth missing (living people)
University of Jyväskylä alumni
Finnish musicologists
Finnish expatriates in the United Kingdom
21st-century Finnish musicians